Motability is a charity in the United Kingdom. It oversees Motability Operations Ltd, which runs the Motability Scheme intended to enable disabled people, their families and their carers to lease a new car, scooter or powered wheelchair, using their disability benefit. Currently, the scheme has more than 650,000 customers.

Motability was founded in 1977 by Lord Sterling of Plaistow and the late Lord Goodman and the Motability Scheme was launched at Earl's Court, London, on 25 July 1978. It was initially targeted at motorists aged 16–19 years, with some 220 applications being processed at the beginning of the scheme.

It is a partnership between the charitable sector, the UK government, leading banks, and the motor and insurance industries. Since 1978 over three million cars, scooters and powered wheelchairs have been provided to help disabled people with their mobility needs.

Queen Elizabeth II had been the Chief Patron of Motability since its foundation.

History and beginnings
By the mid-1970s over 40% of households in the country owned a car but disabled people were underrepresented. Only those who could drive themselves received any government help with transport, usually in the form of a blue trike which was unable to take passengers.

The Mobility Allowance – now called the mobility component of PIP, formerly Disability Living Allowance – introduced by the Government in 1976 broke the mould in giving help regardless of ability to drive. It also signalled the Government's commitment to giving disabled people choice in the form of a cash allowance, rather than imposing certain types of vehicles on them. The War Pensioners' Mobility Supplement pre-dates the Mobility Allowance by a number of years. However, when the government subsequently introduced the Mobility Allowance they set it at a lower weekly rate than the prevailing War Pensioners Mobility Supplement. This difference continues as both are increased annually by the same metric. 

The Mobility Allowance was a positive advance but it soon became clear that it was not large enough to buy and run even the smallest car. The then Secretary of State for Health and Social Services invited the late Lord Goodman and (now Lord) Jeffrey Sterling to consider how disabled people could use this allowance to affordably obtain a vehicle.

Thus Motability was born in 1977 and, often for the first time, disabled people could afford a good-quality car from any participating manufacturer, fully insured, serviced, and with breakdown assistance. Motability was set up as a charity so it could also raise funds and make grants, in order to provide customers with a complete mobility package even if their allowance would not cover the type of car and adaptations that they needed.

Motability opened up new horizons for many disabled people. Things that were once difficult to do, such as getting to work, going shopping, doing volunteer work, visiting friends, getting to the doctor, going swimming, giving a family member a lift, or enjoying a driving holiday, became easier. For some, enhanced opportunities for further education and profitable full-time employment became a reality for the first time.

On 25 July 1978 ten young people attended the first Motability Scheme vehicle handover at Earls Court in London and received the keys to their new vehicles from then Chairman Lord Goodman. Julie Newport, disabled by polio, was one of the ten to receive her keys and commented: "I think it's marvellous," saying the Scheme gave disabled people the freedom and independence they really wanted. Also present were Rt Hon Lord Morris, Rt Hon Lord Jenkin, Allan Beard and Jeffrey Sterling, the present Chairman of Motability.

In 2003, Motability celebrated its 25th anniversary with a garden at the Chelsea Flower Show. The garden included a Motability car, an adapted Renault Clio, to symbolise disabled people gaining access to the remotest parts of the countryside.

In October 2006, the Scheme hit the two million vehicles mark and Jeffrey Sterling commented: "Family life revolves around the disabled person so if you make someone mobile you don't help two million, it's more like six to eight million."

The late Lord Goodman described the establishment of Motability in 1977 as "the most successful achievement of my career and the most fortunate thought that ever came into my head".

How the scheme works

The Scheme is open to anyone in receipt of the Higher Rate Mobility Component of Disability Living Allowance, the Enhanced Mobility Component of Personal Independence Payment, the Scottish Higher rate mobility component of Child or Adult Disability Payment, an Armed Forces Independence Payment or the War Pensioners' Mobility Supplement. From 11 April 2022, the amount payable for HRDLA, the Enhanced Mobility rate of PIP, Armed Forces Independence Payment and Scottish Higher rate Mobility Component of Child/Adult Disability Payment is £64.50 per week (£71.00 per week from April 2023) and War Pensioners Mobility Supplement is £72.00 per week (£79.25 per week from April 2023). Those wishing to lease through Motability must have at least twelve months' award length remaining when they apply. The Care Component of DLA/PIP etc cannot be used to fund a vehicle through the scheme.

Due to the weekly difference of £8.25 per week extra (From Apr 23) between War Pensioners' Mobility Supplement and DLA/PIP/AFIP/Scottish Higher rate mobility component of Child/Adult Disability Payment mobility components, the Motability advance payments for War Pensioners Mobility Supplement customers are lowered by roughly £1253 to ensure that over the course of the full 3-year lease all customers will pay exactly the same amount for the same vehicle on the scheme. Should a War Pensioners' Mobility Supplement Motability customer enter into an extended lease beyond the standard 3-year lease period (or 5 years for Wheelchair Accessible Vehicles) this £8.25 per week is returned to the War Pensioner by Motability Operations. This is again to ensure all customers pay exactly the same during an extended lease period.

Customers choose a new car every three years or a wheelchair-accessible vehicle every five years. More than 20 manufacturers currently offer cars through the scheme, with premium manufacturers such as Audi becoming popular alternatives to more mainstream suppliers such as Ford and Vauxhall. Insurance for up to three approved drivers, vehicle excise duty, servicing with a free replacement vehicle, tyres and breakdown cover are all included in a single monthly payment. This payment is made automatically by the Department for Work and Pensions or Veterans UK to Motability Operations under the authority of a CP50 form signed by the hirer. At the end of the contract period, the customer can choose to take another brand new vehicle. The customer may also wish to purchase their current vehicle directly from Motability at the end of their contract either for their own use or a friend's.

While some vehicles do not require the customer to pay anything above their Mobility allowance, the customer may choose to opt for a higher-specified model on payment of an Advance Payment which is non-returnable. Motability pricing is independently assessed as being more than 40% cheaper than retail lease agreements, which is possible because of the unique VAT concessions that the Motability Scheme enjoys. In addition, means-tested grants are available from the Motability charity for those who, because of the nature of their disability, have no option but to choose a vehicle which attracts an advance payment, or who may need special adaptations not already funded through the scheme. Many adaptations, such as push/pull brake/accelerator levers, are now also funded directly through the scheme so that the customer may not have to pay extra.

There are separate non-means tested grants for adaptations, including an automatic transmission grant of up to £660, paid by Veterans UK, for those in receipt of War Pensioners' Mobility Supplement, subject to needing the adaption(s) due to the War Pensionable disability/condition.

Market penetration
Almost 648,000 customers currently choose Motability for their mobility needs equating to more than 200,000 vehicles purchased per year by Motability Operations. Overall customer satisfaction is independently measured at 98%. In autumn 2015 Motability Operations was judged by the Institute for Customer Service to offer the 'highest customer service in the UK'. Around two-thirds of Motability's customers drive their own vehicle, but non-drivers can get a car as a passenger. Similarly, parents and caregivers can also apply on behalf of a disabled child from the age of three.

Once their application has been accepted, the customer uses all, or part, of their allowance to pay for their vehicle for the period of the contract hire agreement. Over 450 models of car are currently available to lease with no advance payment – larger or more expensive models may incur this additional cost.

The largest fleet operator in Europe and the largest supplier of used cars in the trade, Motability Operations is owned by four major clearing banks – Barclays, Lloyds TSB, HSBC and the Royal Bank of Scotland.

Motability Operations' annual turnover is around £4.2bn. Any surpluses are continually reinvested in the business or donated to the Motability charity. Motability Operations sells over 200,000 used cars a year and the company's car purchases account for approximately ten percent of total new car sales in the UK. Since the Scheme started, over four million cars have been supplied.

Structure of the scheme
The organisational structure of the scheme can be broken into two parts: Motability, which is a registered charity, and Motability Operations (formerly Motability Finance Ltd), a public limited company owned by five clearing banks which operates the car and powered wheelchair leasing scheme on behalf of Motability. Splitting the organisation is intended to provide for checks and balances and ensure accountability for the administration of public funds. Salaries paid to Motability Operations Group PLC management have attracted negative publicity, with former CEO Mike Betts taking home total remuneration of £948,243 in 2016, as reported in Motability Operations Group PLC's accounts. Betts quit in 2018.

Motability is a registered charity and has overall responsibility for the Motability Scheme, including:

Directing and overseeing the Scheme;
Raising funds to provide financial assistance through grants to customers who would otherwise be unable to participate in the Scheme;
Administering the Government's Specialised Vehicles Fund which provides financial assistance for customers who need complex adaptations or to travel in their wheelchairs; and
Providing technical support to customers and the adaptation and conversion industry.

Motability Operations has the exclusive contract for administering the scheme. Any profits are reinvested in the Scheme or donated to the Motability charity. In the financial year ending 30 September 2016, Motability Operations reported post-tax profits of £130m net of a donation to Motability (the charity) of £45m. In 2021, the donation was £170 million

Motability Operations also set and monitors the standards of service provided by the dealer network, adaptations suppliers, breakdown company and the insurance company. Motability Operations also negotiates pricing with the vehicle manufacturers on a quarterly basis.

Insurance is provided exclusively by Royal and Sun Alliance who have a dedicated Motability division. Royal and Sun Alliance require any persons wishing to be one of the three named drivers to have no or possibly some minor endorsements on their driving licence in the last five years. The excess for any claims has recently increased but remains competitive at £100. A third driver is permitted and subject to certain constraints on vehicle choice, additional drivers can include anyone from age 17 upwards (subject to the vehicle's insurance group for drivers under 25 years of age) provided they live with the disabled customer. Drink-driving convictions require five years from conviction date to be eligible for insurance on a Motability car. From early 2023, Direct Line will replace RSA as insurance provider to the Motability scheme.

Breakdown cover is provided exclusively by the RAC.

Adaptations are supplied and fitted by independent specialists who are accredited to Motability.

Customers apply via accredited main car dealerships.

The Wheelchair and Scooter Scheme was operated by Route2mobility until June 2010, when it was taken over by Motability Operations.

Welfare reform 
In 2013, the Government started to introduce a new disability benefit, the Personal Independence Payment (PIP), which will gradually replace the Disability Living Allowance for disabled people aged between 16 and 64. Customers have started to be reassessed and as a result in some cases no longer receive an allowance that entitles them to access the Motability Scheme. Motability Operations have worked with Motability to devise a package of transitional support that pays up to £2000 to those customers who have lost their allowance as a result of the introduction of PIP. Motability Operations have donated £175m to Motability (the charity) to ensure that the cost of this package is supported.

Despite the introduction of PIP and the expectation that the number of customers on the Scheme would reduce as a result of the change, Motability customer numbers have stayed broadly static – only 25,000 customers left the scheme due to loss of their allowance in FY16, while 68,000 new customers joined.

Controversy 

On 7 December 2018 the National Audit Office published its report on Motability which upheld many criticisms of executive pay and reserves policy. It also found that Motability had charged customers more than £390 million more than necessary for car leases over the past ten years and that the then CEO was entitled to further payments beyond those that had already been disclosed.

See also 
 Disabled parking permit
 Wheelchair accessible van

References

External links

Motability Annual Report 2006/07 
 Disability Living Allowance

Disability organisations based in the United Kingdom
Automobile associations in the United Kingdom
1977 establishments in the United Kingdom
Organizations established in 1977